Sandra Martinović (born 4 October 1979) is a Bosnian-Herzegovinian former tennis player. Her career-high WTA singles ranking is No. 187, achieved on 28 July 2008, and her best doubles ranking world No. 199, achieved on 28 April 2008.

Career
Martinović is the daughter of Ivo and Mara Martinović and she first played tennis aged nine. Her family moved from Bosnia Herzegovina to Austria when she was 12, where she practiced in Hermagor. At the age of 17, she won her first WTA ranking points, and after finishing school, she moved to Germany to become a professional tennis player.

She improved her ranking to 187 in 2008 when she reached the third round of qualifying for the French Open and also played qualifications at Wimbledon and the US Open the same year. In her career, she won 13 singles titles and 11 doubles titles. In 2006, she was acknowledged as "one of the most successful players" on the European circuit by Tennis Europe, the sanctioning body of European women's tournament of the ITF Women's Circuit.

At the end of 2012, Martinović ended her career. She had won over $130,000, and is now working as coach at the Swiss Tennis Academy. in Biel, Switzerland.

ITF Circuit finals

Singles: 17 (13–4)

Doubles: 21 (11–10)

References

External links
 
 
 

1979 births
Living people
People from Brčko District
Croats of Bosnia and Herzegovina
Bosnia and Herzegovina female tennis players
Yugoslav expatriate sportspeople in Switzerland
Yugoslav expatriate sportspeople in Germany
Yugoslav expatriate sportspeople in Austria